Art Napoleon (1920–2003) was a film director and writer from New York City.

Select credits
The Sharkfighters (1956) – story
Man on the Prowl (1957) – writer, director, producer
Whirlybirds (1957–60) (TV series) – creator
Too Much, Too Soon (1958) – writer, director
The Last Frontier (1959) – writer, director of pilot for TV series for Fox
Ride the Wild Surf (1964) – writer
The Activist (1969) – writer, producer, director

References

External links

1920 births
2003 deaths
American male screenwriters
Film directors from New York City
Screenwriters from New York (state)
20th-century American male writers
20th-century American screenwriters